The 2018 Tajik Supercup was the 9th Tajik Supercup, an annual Tajik football match played between the winners of the previous season's Tajik League and Tajik Cup. The match was contested by 2017 Tajik League champions Istiklol, and the 2017 Tajik Cup champions Khujand. It was held at the Central Stadium in Hisor on 2 March 2018. Istiklol won the match 3–2 thanks to an extra-time winner from Nozim Babadjanov. Khujand led a 2-1 at halftime thanks to goals from Firdavs Chakalov and Agbley Jones, with Istiklol getting one back on the brink of halftime after Chakalov. I the second half Belarusian striker Mikalay Zyanko equalised for Istiklol sending the game in to extra time. At the beginning of the second-half of extra-time Nozim Babadjanov gave Istiklol the lead and completed their comeback to win their 7th Supercup.

Match details

See also
2017 Tajik League
2017 Tajik Cup

References

Super Cup
Tajik Supercup